Konrad Bollstatter, also known as Konrad Müller (born in the 1420s, died 1482/1483) was a professional scribe of Augsburg, employed in chancelleries in Öttingen and Höchstädt. He is notable for his informed and erudite treatment of his source texts, often inserting additions for the benefit of his learned readers.

He is known as the scribe of the following manuscripts:
 Cgm 312
 Cgm 252
 Cgm 213
 Heidelberg Cpg 4
 Wolfenbüttel Cod. Guelf. 75.10 Aug. 2°
 Wolfenbüttel Cod. Guelf. 37.17 Aug. 2°
 Berlin Mgf 564
 Berlin Mgf 722
 Prague national museum Cod. XVI.A.6
 London BL Add. 16581
 Cgm 463
 Cgm 758
 Cgm 735
 Cgm 7366
 part of the  Älteres öttingisches Lehenbuch, Harburg
 Alba Iulia Ms. I.115
 Augsburg Stadtarchiv Schätze 19
 Augsburg Stadtarchiv 121
 extensions to Cgm 568

1420s births
1480s deaths
15th-century German writers
German scribes
German male writers
Medieval European scribes